This article lists players who have captained the Kilkenny minor hurling team in the Leinster Minor Hurling Championship and the All-Ireland Minor Hurling Championship. The captain is usually chosen from the club that has won the Kilkenny Minor Hurling Championship.

List of captains

References

Hurlers
+Captains
Kilkenny